Prince Stéphane de Lobkowicz (born 29 July 1957) is a Belgian lawyer, author, and politician who served in the Brussels Parliament.

Biography
A member of the Lobkowicz noble family, he is a member of the Brussels Bar and wrote a biography about King Baudouin and an uchronie about Queen Astrid, Queen Astrid Did Not Die In Kussnacht'. He married Barbara d'Ursel de Lobkowicz, also a member of the Brussels Parliament.

He was elected to the Brussels Parliament in 1989 and served until 2009.

His daughter Ariane de Lobkowicz-d'Ursel was elected to the Brussels Parliament in 2019.

References

1957 births
Members of the Parliament of the Brussels-Capital Region
DéFI politicians
Lobkowicz family
Living people